In chemistry, subhalide usually refers to inorganic compounds that have a low ratio of halide to metal, made possible by metal–metal bonding (or element–element bonding for nonmetals), sometimes extensive. Many compounds meet this definition.

Examples
The normal halide of boron is BF3. Boron forms many subhalides: several B2X4, including B2F4; also BF. Aluminium forms a variety of subhalides. For gallium, adducts of Ga2Cl4 are known. Phosphorus subhalides include P2I4, P4Cl2, and P7Cl3 (structurally related to P73−). For bismuth, the compound originally described as bismuth monochloride was later shown to consist of Bi95+ clusters and chloride anions. There are many tellurium subhalides, including Te3Cl2, Te2X (X = Cl, Br, I), and two forms of TeI.

References

Inorganic compounds